Statistics of Allsvenskan in season 1983.

Overview
The league was contested by 12 teams, with AIK winning the league and IFK Göteborg winning the Swedish championship after the play-offs.

League table

Results

Allsvenskan play-offs
The 1983 Allsvenskan play-offs was the second edition of the competition. The eight best placed teams from Allsvenskan qualified to the competition. IFK Göteborg who finished third in the league won the competition and the Swedish championship after defeating Öster who finished fourth in the league.

Quarter-finals

First leg

Second leg

Semi-finals

First leg

Second leg

Final

Season statistics

Top scorers

Footnotes

References 

Allsvenskan seasons
Swed
Swed
1